The 2017 PDC Unicorn Development Tour consisted of 20 darts tournaments on the 2017 PDC Pro Tour.

Prize money
The prize money for the Development Tour events remained the same from 2016, with each event having a prize fund of £10,000.

This is how the prize money is divided:

February

Development Tour 1
Development Tour 1 was contested on Saturday 18 February 2017 at the Robin Park Tennis Centre in Wigan.

Development Tour 2
Development Tour 2 was contested on Saturday 18 February 2017 at the Robin Park Tennis Centre in Wigan.

Development Tour 3
Development Tour 3 was contested on Sunday 19 February 2017 at the Robin Park Tennis Centre in Wigan.

Development Tour 4
Development Tour 4 was contested on Sunday 19 February 2017 at the Robin Park Tennis Centre in Wigan.

March

Development Tour 5
Development Tour 5 was contested on Saturday 18 March 2017 at the Robin Park Tennis Centre in Wigan.

Development Tour 6
Development Tour 6 was contested on Saturday 18 March 2017 at the Robin Park Tennis Centre in Wigan.

Development Tour 7
Development Tour 7 was contested on Sunday 19 March 2017 at the Robin Park Tennis Centre in Wigan.

Development Tour 8
Development Tour 8 was contested on Sunday 19 March 2017 at the Robin Park Tennis Centre in Wigan.

May

Development Tour 9
Development Tour 9 was contested on Saturday 27 May 2017 at Halle 39 in Hildesheim.

Development Tour 10
Development Tour 10 was contested on Saturday 27 May 2017 at Halle 39 in Hildesheim.

Development Tour 11
Development Tour 11 was contested on Sunday 28 May 2017 at Halle 39 in Hildesheim.

Development Tour 12
Development Tour 12 was contested on Sunday 28 May 2017 at Halle 39 in Hildesheim.

September

Development Tour 13
Development Tour 13 was contested on Saturday 16 September 2017 at Barnsley Metrodome in Barnsley.

Development Tour 14
Development Tour 14 was contested on Saturday 16 September 2017 at Barnsley Metrodome in Barnsley.

Development Tour 15
Development Tour 15 was contested on Sunday 17 September 2017 at Barnsley Metrodome in Barnsley.

Development Tour 16
Development Tour 16 was contested on Sunday 17 September 2017 at Barnsley Metrodome in Barnsley.

November

Development Tour 17
Development Tour 17 was contested on Saturday 4 November 2017 at the Robin Park Tennis Centre in Wigan.

Development Tour 18
Development Tour 18 was contested on Saturday 4 November 2017 at the Robin Park Tennis Centre in Wigan.

Development Tour 19
Development Tour 19 was contested on Sunday 5 November 2017 at the Robin Park Tennis Centre in Wigan.

Development Tour 20
Development Tour 20 was contested on Sunday 5 November 2017 at the Robin Park Tennis Centre in Wigan.

References

2017 in darts
2017 PDC Pro Tour